Ohrid is a city in North Macedonia and is the seat of the Ohrid Municipality. It is the largest city on Lake Ohrid and the eighth-largest city in the country, with the municipality recording a population of over 42,000 inhabitants as of 2002. Ohrid is known for once having 365 churches, one for each day of the year, and has been referred to as a "Jerusalem of the Balkans". The city is rich in picturesque houses and monuments, and tourism is predominant. It is located southwest of Skopje, west of Resen and Bitola. In 1979 and in 1980 respectively, Ohrid and Lake Ohrid were accepted as Cultural and Natural World Heritage Sites by UNESCO. Ohrid is one of only 28 sites that are part of UNESCO's World Heritage that are Cultural as well as Natural sites.

Name 

In antiquity the city was known under the ancient Greek name of Λυχνίς (Lychnis) and Λυχνιδός (Lychnidos) and the Latin Lychnidus, probably meaning "city of light", literally "a precious stone that emits light", from λύχνος (lychnos), "lamp, portable light". Polybius, writing in the second century BC, refers to the town as Λυχνίδιον - Lichnidion. It became capital of the First Bulgarian Empire in the early medieval period, and was often referred to by Byzantine writers as Achrida (Ἄχριδα, Ὄχριδα, or Ἄχρις). By 879 AD, the town was no longer called Lychnidos but was referred to as Ohrid. It has been proposed by Katičić that the modern name is a modified version of the ancient Greek name, where the transition of "Lychnidus" to "Ohrid" presupposes a characteristic sound development from Albanian which may have thereby entered Slavic. According to Doikov, Ohrid may have originated from the Slavic expression "во рид" (vo rid) meaning "on hill". In Macedonian and the other South Slavic languages, the name of the city is Ohrid (Охрид). In Albanian, the city is known as Ohër or Ohri and in modern Greek Ochrida (Οχρίδα, Ωχρίδα) and Achrida (Αχρίδα).

History

Antiquity 

The earliest inhabitants of the widest Lake Ohrid region were the Illyrian tribes of Enchele and Dassaretii. According to a tradition the town, called Lychnidos in classical antiquity, was founded by the Phoenician king of Thebes, Cadmus, who, banished from Thebes, in Boeotia, fled to the Enchele to the north and founded Lychnidus on the shore of Lake Ohrid and Budva in Montenegro. Lychnidos was the capital city of the Illyrian Dassaretii.

According to recent excavations this was a town as early as of the era of king Philip II of Macedon. They conclude that Samuil's Fortress was built on the place of an earlier fortification, dated to 4th century BC. In 210 BCE, Philip V of Macedon raided a number of southern Illyrian communities. He maintained a garrison at Lychnidus but lost control of the settlement in 208 BCE, when its commander joined local leader Aeropus and invited the Dardani in the region. 

During the Roman conquests, towards the end of 3rd and the beginning of 2nd century BC, Lychnidus is mentioned as a town near or within Dassaretia. In Roman times it was located along the Via Egnatia, which connected the Adriatic port Dyrrachion (present-day Durrës) with Byzantium. Archaeological excavations (e.g., the Polyconch Basilica from 5th century) prove early adoption of Christianity in the area. Bishops from Lychnidos participated in multiple ecumenical councils.

Middle Ages 

The South Slavs began to arrive in the area during the 6th century AD. By the early 7th century it was colonized by a Slavic tribe known as the Berziti. Bulgaria conquered the city around 840. 

The name Ohrid first appeared in 879. The Ohrid Literary School established in 886 by Clement of Ohrid became one of the two major cultural centres of the First Bulgarian Empire. Between 990 and 1015, Ohrid was the capital and stronghold of the Bulgarian Empire. 

From 990 to 1018 Ohrid was also the seat of the Bulgarian Patriarchate. After the Byzantine reconquest of the city in 1018 by Basil II, the Bulgarian Patriarchate was downgraded to an Archbishopric of Ohrid, and placed under the authority of the Ecumenical Patriarch of Constantinople.

The higher clergy after 1018 was almost invariably Greek, including during the period of Ottoman domination, until the abolition of the archbishopric in 1767. At the beginning of the 16th century the archbishopric reached its peak subordinating the Sofia, Vidin, Vlach and Moldavian eparchies, part of the former medieval Serbian Patriarchate of Peć, (including Patriarchal Monastery of Peć itself), and even the Orthodox districts of Italy (Apulia, Calabria and Sicily), Venice and Dalmatia.

As an episcopal city, Ohrid was a cultural center of great importance for the Balkans. Almost all surviving churches were built by the Byzantines and by the Bulgarians, the rest of them date back to the short time of Serbian rule during the late Middle Ages.

Bohemond, leading a Norman army from southern Italy, took the city in 1083. Byzantines regained it in 1085. In the 13th and 14th century the city changed hands between the Despotate of Epirus, the Bulgarian, the Byzantine and the Serbian Empire, as well as Albanian rulers. In the mid-13th century Ohrid was one of the cities ruled by Pal Gropa, a member of the Albanian noble Gropa family. 

In a text by Emperor John VI Kantakouzenos there is mention of nomadic Albanians present in the vicinity of Ohrid at around 1328. In 1334 the city was captured by Stefan Uroš IV Dušan and incorporated in the Serbian Empire. After Dusan's death the city came under the control of Andrea Gropa, while after his death Prince Marko incorporated it in the Kingdom of Prilep. 

In the early 1370s Marko lost Ohrid to Pal II Gropa, another member of the Gropa family and unsuccessfully tried to recapture it in 1375 with Ottoman assistance. 
 
In 1395, the Ottomans under Bayezid I captured the city which became the seat of the newly established Sanjak of Ohrid. Some time after Gjergj Kastrioti Skanderbeg had liberated Krujë to begin his rebellion, his troops - in coordination with Gjergj Arianiti and Zahari Gropa (of the local Albanian Gropa noble family) - liberated Ohrid and the castle of Svetigrad. 

In 14–15 September 1464, 12,000 Albanian troops of the League of Lezhë and 1,000 of the Republic of Venice defeated a 14,000-man Ottoman force near the city in the Battle of Ohrid. When Mehmed II returned from Albania after his actions against Skanderbeg in 1466, he dethroned Dorotheos, the Archbishop of Ohrid, and expatriated him together with his clerks and boyars and considerable number of citizens of Ohrid to Istanbul, probably because of their anti-Ottoman activities during Skanderbeg's rebellion when many citizens of Ohrid, including Dorotheos and his clergy, supported Skanderbeg and his fight.

Ottoman Period 
During the 16th century, Ohrid was located in the Sanjak of Ohrid. The Sanjak of Ohrid, in the years 1529-1536, had 33,271 households (32,648 Christians and 623 Muslims), with 1331 widows and 3392 unmarried singles. There were 859 settlements and 10 cities, with an average of 28.7 houses per settlement. Ohrid itself had 337 Christian families, 44 unmarried singles, 12 widows and 93 Muslim families. In 1583, the Sanjak of Ohrid was made up of several Kazas, including the Kaza of Ohrid, which were in turn made of Nahiyes; the Ottoman Defter recorded, within the Nahiya of Ohrid, 2,920 Christian homes, 627 unmarried singles and 465 Muslim families within a total of 107 settlements.

The Christian population declined during the first centuries of Ottoman rule. In 1664, there were only 142 Christian households. The situation changed in the 18th century when Ohrid emerged as an important trade center on a major trade route. At the end of this century it had around five thousand inhabitants. Towards the end of the 18th century and in the early part of the 19th century, Ohrid region, like other parts of European Turkey, was a hotbed of unrest. In the 19th century the region of Ohrid became part of the Pashalik of Scutari, ruled by the Bushati family. 

After the Christian population of the bishopric of Ohrid voted on a plebiscite in 1874 overwhelmingly in favour of joining the Bulgarian Exarchate (97%), the Exarchate became in control of the area.

Modern 

Before 1912, Ohrid was a township center bounded to Monastir sanjak in Manastir Vilayet (present-day Bitola). The city remained under Ottoman rule until 29 November 1912, when the Serbian army took control of the city during the Balkan Wars and later made it the capital of Ohrid district. In Ohrid, Serbian forces killed 150 Bulgarians and 500 people consisting of Albanians and Turks. In September 1913 local Albanian and pro-Bulgarian Internal Macedonian Revolutionary Organization leaders rebelled against the Kingdom of Serbia. It was occupied by Kingdom of Bulgaria between 1915 and 1918 during World War I.

During Kingdom of Yugoslavia Ohrid continued to be as an independent district (Охридског округа) (1918-1922), then it became a part of Bitola Oblast (1920-1929), and then from 1929 to 1941, Ohrid was part of the Vardar Banovina. It was occupied again by Bulgaria between 1941 and 1944 during World War II. Since the days of SFR Yugoslavia Ohrid has been the municipal seat of Municipality of Ohrid (Општина Охрид). Since 1991 the town was part of the Republic of Macedonia (now North Macedonia).

On 20 November 1993, Avioimpex Flight 110 crashed near Ohrid, killing all 116 people on board. It is the deadliest aviation disaster to occur in North Macedonia.

Geography and climate
Ohrid is located in the south-western part of North Macedonia, on the shore of Lake Ohrid, at an elevation of 695 meters above sea level.

The warmest month is August with average range of -. The rainiest month is November, which sees on average  of rain.

Demographics 

At the 2021 census, Ohrid had 38,818 residents with the following ethnic makeup:
Macedonians, 28,920 (74.5%)
Persons for whom data are taken from administrative sources, 3,421 (8.8%)
others, 2,728 (7.0%)
Albanians, 1,924 (5.0%)
Turks, 1,825 (4.7%)

As of the 2002 census, the city of Ohrid has 42,033 inhabitants and the ethnic composition was the following:

Macedonians, 33,791 (80.4%)
Albanians, 2,959 (7.0%)
Turks, 2,256 (5.4%)
others, 3,027 (7.2%)

The mother tongues of the city's residents include the following:
Macedonian, 34,910 (83.1%)
Albanian, 3,957 (9.4%)
Turkish, 2,226 (5.3%)
others, 1,017 (2.4%)

The religious composition of the city was the following:
Orthodox Christians, 33,987 (80.9%)
Muslims, 7,599 (18.1%)
others, 447 (1.1%)

The oldest inhabitants of Ohrid are a few families that reside in the Varoš neighbourhood. Other Macedonians have settled in Ohrid and originate from the villages of the Kosel, Struga, Drimkol, Debarca, Malesija and Kičevo regions and other areas from southern Macedonia. In 1949, additional families from Aegean Macedonia settled in Ohrid.

The presence of the Turkish community dates from their settlement in Ohrid during 1451–81. All Turks from the village of Peštani after selling properties and land moved to Ohrid by 1920 and today those few families are known as Peştanlı.

Albanians in Ohrid originate from Albanian villages located on the western and southern areas of Lake Ohrid. 
There is a sizeable amount of Turkified Albanians in Ohrid who originate from the cities of Elbasan, Durrës and Ulcinj. Orthodox Albanians are also present and settled in Ohrid during the second half of the 19th century and originate from Pogradec, Lin, Çërravë and Peshkëpi.

The local Romani population in Ohrid originates from Podgradec and speaks the southern Tosk Albanian dialect. In the latter decades of the 20th century, some Albanian speaking Muslim Romani from the villages of Krani and Nakolec have migrated to Ohrid. In Yugoslav censuses, Albanophone Ohrid Romani mainly declared as Albanians. As tensions between Albanians and the state increased over numbers regarding community size and sociopolitical rights, Romani identity became politicized and contested from the 1990s onward. Ohrid Albanophone Romani refused identification as Albanians seeing it as a result of Albanisation (or to be called Gypsies) and with encouragement from Macedonian circles now refers to itself as Egyptians whose ancestors migrated from Egypt many centuries ago. The Albanian language is considered by Ohrid Albanophone Romani as only an idiom of the home and not a mother tongue. Turkish speaking Romani reside in Ohrid that during the Yugoslav period self declared themselves mainly as Turks, while within independent Macedonia they identify as Egyptians.

The earliest presence of the Aromanian population in Ohrid dates to 1778 arriving from Voskopojë, others from Kavajë (late 18th century), from the Myzeqe region, Elbasan, Llëngë and Mokër region (mid. 19th century) and also from Gorna Belica and Malovišta (late 19th century). A large part of Ohrid's Aromanian population has emigrated to Trieste, Odessa and Bucharest.

Demographic History 
In 1889, according to a French research, the city had 2.500-3.000 houses and approximately 12.000 individuals, of which 2/3 were Bulgarians and Vlachs and the rest 1/3 were Albanophone Muslims with 20-25 Slavophone Greek families. In statistics gathered by Vasil Kanchov in 1900, the city of Ohrid was inhabited by 8000 Bulgarians, 5000 Turks, 500 Muslim Albanians, 300 Christian Albanians, 460 Vlachs and 600 Romani. In 1903, the Cartographic Society of Sofia registered 8,893 households of Albanian or Vlach ethnicity in the Kaza of Ohrid; there were errors, however, in regards to the city of Ohrid itself. There were supposedly 2,610 households registered in Ohrid, but after further analysis of these documents by Dervishi et al., it was discovered that the city actually had 3,700 households; there were 2,100 Albanian Muslim households, 150 Albanian Christian households, 900 Bulgarian households, 300 Vlach households, 210 Serb households and 39 Greek households. The Cartographic Society of Sofia also incorrectly registered many villages - that were in fact inhabited entirely or mostly by Albanians (both Christians and Muslims) - as Bulgarian. 14 villages were registered as Albanian with 991 households, but further investigation by Dervishi et al. revealed that the number was actually 2,400. Therefore, with those corrections, the Kaza of Ohrid had 5,336 Albanian households, 4,347 Slavic households, 1,549 mixed household and 125 Vlach households that were mainly spread across two villages. By the end of Ottoman rule, the Kaza of Ohrid itself numbered to 38,000 Albanian inhabitants and 36,500 non-Albanian (Bulgarian, Serbs, Vlachs and Orthodox Albanians who recognised the exarch and were therefore classed as Bulgarians) inhabitants as indicated by statistics gathered from the Ottoman authorities.

Cultural Heritage sites 

Ohrid Municipality is home to over 250 sites declared as Cultural Heritage by the Ministy of Culture, of which a majority lie within the city of Ohrid.

Christian sites
There is a legend supported by observations by the 17th century Ottoman traveler Evliya Çelebi that there were 365 chapels within the town boundaries, one for every day of the year. Today this number is significantly smaller.
Church of the Holy Mother of God - Bolnička
Church of Saint Nicholas - Bolnički
Little Church of Saint Clement
Church of Saint Nicholas the Wonderworker
Church of Saint Sophia
Church of Saint Nicholas - Gerakomija
Church of Saint John the Baptist - Kaneo
Church of Saint Vrači (Saints Kuzman and Damjan), with frescos from the 14th century. A 14th-century icon from the church is depicted on the obverse of the 1000 denars banknote, issued in 1996 and 2003.
Church of Saints Clement and Panteleimon
Church of Saint Nicholas - Arbanaški
Church of the Holy Mother of God - Perivleptos
Church of Saint Demetrius
Little Church of Saint Vrači (Saints Kuzman and Damjan)
Church of Saints Constantine and Elena
Church of the Holy Mother of God Čelnica
Church of the Holy Mother of God Kamensko
Church of Saint Nicholas
Church of Saint George
Grave of Grigor Prličev
Church of Saint Barbara
Church of the Holy Mother of God Pandonos
Ohrid Catholic Church

Besides being a holy center of the region, it is also the source of knowledge and pan-Slavic literacy. The restored Monastery at Plaošnik was actually one of the oldest Universities in the western world, dating before the 10th century. Several of Ohrid's best-known churches and monasteries, such as the Monastery of Saint Naum lie in its surrounding villages.

Old town architecture
Dozens of individual homes and several commercial buildings in Ohrid are listed as Cultural Heritage sites. Some of these, such as the Robevi family house and the Prličev family home, function as museums today. Also included are the Saint Clement of Ohrid Gymnasium, the Ohrid Clock Tower, and the Icon Gallery

Islamic sites
Zejnel Abedin Pasha Tekke and Kadri Sheh House
Sinan Çelebi Türbe
Ali Pasha Mosque
Hadži Hamza Mosque
Emin Mahmud Mosque
Voska Hamam
Eski Hamam
Kuloglu Mosque
Hadži Durgut Mosque
Hajdar Pasha Mosque
Keshanli Mosque

Archaeological sites
Karagjulevci tombs from Ancient Macedonian era
Ancient Theatre of Ohrid from Hellenistic and Roman time
Mančevci site with early Christian basilica
Plaošnik
Samuel's Fortress and remaining portions of the city walls
Saint 40 Holy Martyrs early Christian basilica
Saint Erasmus
Studenčišta basilica
Hermeleja, Roman-era settlement
Vidobišta Roman-era tombs
Kozluk, Roman-era settlement
Several other minor sites

Transportation 

There is a nearby international airport, Ohrid Airport (now known as "St. Paul the Apostle Airport").

Sports
GFK Ohrid Lihnidos is a football team playing at the SRC Biljanini Izvori stadium in the city. As of the 2021–22 season they play in the second tier of the Macedonian Football League system.

FK Voska Sport is also a football team in Ohrid that competes in the Macedonian Second League as of the 2021-22 season.

RK Ohrid is a handball team playing at Biljanini Izvori Sports Hall arena, with a capacity of 3,500. As of the 2016–17 season they play in the Macedonian Handball Super League, which is the top tier.

The Ohrid Swimming Marathon is an international open water swimming competition, always taking place in the waters of Lake Ohrid. The swimmers are supposed to swim  from the monastery of Saint Naum to the Ohrid harbor.

Recurring events 
 Ohrid Summer Festival, annual theater and music festival from July to August
 Ohrid Choir Festival, annual international choir festival at the end of August
 The Balkan Festival of Folk Songs and Dances, annual folklore music and dance festival at the beginning of July
 Balkan music square festival, music festival in August in which ethnic musicians from the whole Balkan peninsular participate
 Ohrid Fest (Охридски Трубадури), music festival in August in which musicians from the whole Balkan peninsular participate. This festival is held for four days which are divided into 
Debutant Night, 
Folk Night, 
Pop Night and 
International Night.
 World Prized of Humanism in the Ohrid Academy of Humanism, created by Jordan Plevnes
 Ohrid art and scientific meetings (Охридска научна и уметничка визита), held in House of Uranija-MANU, Ohrid by Macedonian academy of science and arts

Twin towns – sister cities

Ohrid is twinned with:

 Budva, Montenegro
 Caen, France
 Givatayim, Israel
 Inđija, Serbia
 Kragujevac, Serbia
 Mostar, Bosnia and Herzegovina
 Pogradec, Albania
 Piran, Slovenia
 Safranbolu, Turkey
 Stari Grad (Sarajevo), Bosnia and Herzegovina

 Vidovec, Croatia
 Vinkovci, Croatia
 Windsor, Canada
 Wollongong, Australia
 Yalova, Turkey

See also 

 Archbishopric of Ohrid
 List of archbishops of the Archbishopric of Ohrid
 List of people from Ohrid
 Ohrid Agreement
 Macedonian Orthodox Church – Ohrid Archbishopric
 Orthodox Ohrid Archbishopric

References

Sources

External links 

 
 Visit Ohrid – A site to book rooms in Ohrid
 

 
Cities in North Macedonia
Archaeological sites in North Macedonia
World Heritage Sites in North Macedonia
Illyrian North Macedonia
Former capitals of Bulgaria